The Long Rope is a 1961 American Associated Producers Inc Western film directed by William Witney and written by Robert Hamner. The film stars Hugh Marlowe, Alan Hale, Jr., Robert J. Wilke, Chris Robinson, William Kerwin and Jeff Morris. The film was released in February 1961, by 20th Century Fox.

Plot

Cast   
Hugh Marlowe as Jonas Stone
Alan Hale, Jr. as Sheriff John Millard
Robert J. Wilke as Ben Matthews
Chris Robinson as Reb Gilroy
William Kerwin as Steve Matthews
Jeff Morris as Will Matthews
Lisa Montell as Alicia Alvarez
David Renard as Louis Ortega
Madeleine Taylor Holmes as Doña Vega
John A. Alonzo as Manuel Alvarez 
Jack Powers as Luke Simms
Kathryn Hart as Mrs. Creech
Jack Carlin as Henchman
Scott Randall as Henchman
Steve Welles as Jim Matthews
Linda Cordova as Mexican Waitress

Production
The film was produced by Margia Dean, who had appeared in a number of films for Robert L. Lippert. She started up her own production company, Margot Productions. She hired William Witney to direct because she had worked with him on The Secret of the Purple Reef. "He was likeable and worked well with actors", she later said. "He was capable and within the price range, so I hired him... He did a good job."

The film was announced in October 1960.

Dean later announced she would produce Hailstorm Country for 20th Century Fox but the film was not made.

References

External links 
 

1961 films
1960s English-language films
American Western (genre) films
1961 Western (genre) films
20th Century Fox films
Films directed by William Witney
Films scored by Paul Sawtell
1960s American films